Kolinda Grabar-Kitarović served as the 4th President of the Republic of Croatia from 19 February 2015 until 18 February 2020. During that period the president had made 67 official, state and working visits to a total of 36 foreign countries. 

Countries visited by Kolinda Grabar-Kitarović by number of visits until 23 September 2018:

One visit to Argentina, Australia, Azerbaijan, Brazil, Canada, Chile, China, the Holy See, Iceland, Iran, Ireland, Jordan, Kosovo, Kuwait, Lithuania, Macedonia, Mongolia, New Zealand, Qatar, Portugal, Russia, Serbia, Sweden and Turkmenistan
Two visits to Belgium, Bulgaria, Germany, Israel, Malta, Romania and the United Kingdom  
Three visits to Afghanistan, Austria, Hungary, Slovakia and Turkey
Four visits to Poland
Five visits to Slovenia
Six visits to the United States
Seven visits to Bosnia and Herzegovina

Map of foreign visits made by Kolinda Grabar-Kitarović

Foreign visits made by Kolinda Grabar-Kitarović

State visits hosted in Croatia by Kolinda Grabar-Kitarović

See also
List of international presidential trips made by Zoran Milanović, President of Croatia (2020-)

Notes

References

Lists of diplomatic visits by heads of state
Diplomatic visits